Lloyd Jackson may refer to:

 Lloyd G. Jackson (1918–2011), American politician from West Virginia
 Lloyd G. Jackson II (born 1952), American politician from West Virginia
 Lloyd Douglas Jackson (1888–1973), mayor of Hamilton, Ontario
 Lloyd Jackson (ice hockey) (1912–1999), Canadian ice hockey player

See also
 Lloyd D. Jackson Square, shopping center in Hamilton, Ontario